Earth-Two is a fictional universe appearing in American comic book published by DC Comics. Characters who reside on Earth-Two include Superman, Batman, Wonder Woman, and various superheroes and villains and supporting characters in DC Comics.

Notes

References

Earth Two
Earth-Two